The Journal of Geophysics and Engineering is a peer-reviewed scientific journal covering research and developments in geophysics and related areas of engineering. Although the journal has a predominantly applied science and engineering focus, it also publishes contributions in all Earth-physics disciplines from global geophysics to applied and engineering geophysics. The editors-in-chief are Yanghua Wang (Imperial College London) and Qinyong Yang (Sinopec Geophysical Research Institute).

Abstracting and indexing 
The Journal of Geophysics and Engineering is abstracted and indexed in Science Citation Index Expanded, Current Contents/Engineering, Computing and Technology, Current Contents/Physical, Chemical and Earth Sciences, Inspec, Scopus, Astrophysics Data System, and GEOBASE. According to the Journal Citation Reports, the journal has a 2017 impact factor of 1.411.

References

External links 

Engineering journals
Geophysics journals
IOP Publishing academic journals
Physics journals